This list of University of Leeds people is a selected list of notable past staff and students of the University of Leeds.

Students

Politics

Kwabena Kwakye Anti, Ghanaian politician
John Battle, former Labour Member of Parliament for Leeds West (English, 1976)
Irwin Bellow, Baron Bellwin, former Conservative Minister of State for the Environment (LLB in Law)
Sir Bracewell Smith, businessman, Conservative Member of Parliament (1932–45) and Lord Mayor of London (1946).
Alan Campbell, Labour Member of Parliament for Tynemouth and former Government Whip (PGCE)
Mark Collett, former chairman of the Young BNP, the youth division of the British National Party; Director of Publicity for the Party before being suspended from the party in early April 2010 (Business Economics, 2002)
Nambaryn Enkhbayar, former President of Mongolia (2000-2004) (exchange student, 1986)
José Ángel Gurría, economist, secretary general of the Organisation for Economic Co-operation and Development 
Ken Hind, barrister and former Conservative Member of Parliament for West Lancashire (Law, 1971)
Eric Illsley, Labour Member of Parliament for Barnsley Central (LLB in Law)
Chris Leslie, Former Labour Member of Parliament for Shipley (1997-2005) and Nottingham East (2010–19) (Politics and Parliamentary Studies, 1994)
Andrew Leung, current President of the Legislative Council of Hong Kong.
Alison Lowe, first black woman Leeds City Councillor (History, matriculated 1987)
Simba Makoni, Zimbabwean Politician and candidate for Zimbabwe elections 2008
Jess Phillips, Labour Member of Parliament for Birmingham Yardley (UK Parliament constituency) (Economics and Economic History and Social Policy, 2003)
Khalid Samad, Malaysian politician and former Minister Of Federal Territories; Current Member of Parliament for Shah Alam
Clare Short, former Labour Member of Parliament for Birmingham Ladywood and International Development Secretary (Political Science, 1969)
Jeanne Siméon, current  Minister of Habitat, Lands, Infrastructure, and Land Transport in the Seychelles (Education Management and Teacher Training)
Alex Sobel, Labour Co-op Member of Parliament for Leeds North West (Information Systems, 1997)
 Keir Starmer, Leader of the Labour Party from 2020, MP for Holborn and St Pancras from 2015, Director of Public Prosecutions, 2008–2013 (LLB Law, 1985)
Jack Straw, barrister and Labour Member of Parliament for Blackburn; former Home Secretary and Foreign Secretary (LLB in Law, 1967)
Paul Truswell, former Labour Member of Parliament for Pudsey (History, 1977)
 Sayeeda Warsi, Baroness Warsi, former Chairman of the Conservative Party and Minister without Portfolio (LLB in Law)

Media

Timothy Allen, photojournalist  (Zoology, 1989)
Steve Bell, political cartoonist for The Guardian (Fine Art, 1974)
Mark Brayne, BBC foreign correspondent (BA, Modern Languages, 1973)
Mark Byford, deputy Director-General of the BBC (LLB in Law, 1979)
James Cooper, Co-host of My Dad Wrote a Porno
Martine Croxall, TV journalist and news presenter BBC News (BA Geography, 1990)
Barry Cryer, comedian and scriptwriter (English, did not graduate, awarded an honorary doctorate in 2017)
Paul Dacre, editor of the Daily Mail (English, 1970)
Gavin Esler, Newsnight anchor (MA Anglo-Irish Literature, 1975)
Polly Evans, television presenter, South East Today (English & Theatre, 1990s)
Jenni Falconer, television presenter (Student, Spanish and Italian, 1990s)
Tatiana Hambro, fashion writer and editor for Moda Operandi and British Vogue
Nancy Kacungira, Ugandan presenter and correspondent, BBC News  
Andy Kershaw, DJ and broadcaster (Politics)
Liz Kershaw, journalist and radio DJ (Textiles, 1978)
Alice Levine, Co-host of My Dad Wrote a Porno and former BBC Radio 1 DJ
Peter Morgan, screenwriter (Fine Art, 1985)
Jamie Morton, Co-host of My Dad Wrote a Porno
Naga Munchetty, TV presenter and journalist (English Literature and Language, 1997)
Richard Quest, reporter for CNN (Law, 1985)
Anita Rani, English radio and television presenter and journalist (Broadcasting)
Jay Rayner, features writer and restaurant critic, The Observer (Political Studies, 1987)
Steve Rosenberg, BBC Russia editor (Russian Studies, 1991)
Georgie Thompson, Sky Sports News presenter (Broadcast Journalism, 1999)
Mark Wheat, radio DJ at The Current from Minnesota Public Radio (English, 1981)
Nicholas Witchell, BBC newsreader and royal and diplomatic correspondent (LLB in Law, 1976)
Alan Yentob, BBC Creative Director (LLB in Law, 1968)

Arts

Music
The members of Alt-J met at the university (Fine Art; English Literature, 2007)
David Gedge, guitarist, songwriter and vocalist in The Wedding Present, Cinerama (band) (Mathematics, 1981)
Alex Glasgow, singer/songwriter (German)
Mark Knopfler, rock musician, guitarist, singer and songwriter (English, 1973)
Little Boots, born Victoria Hesketh, electronica musician
Corinne Bailey Rae, soul singer (English Literature, 2000)
Simon Rix, bass player for Leeds band Kaiser Chiefs (Maths and Geography, 2000)
Sigma (DJs), English drum and bass duo consisting of Cameron Edwards and Joe Lenzie
Kyle Simmons, member of Bastille
Dan Smith, member of Bastille
Estelle White, composer
Katie White, singer and guitarist of The Ting Tings
Joanne Yeoh, Malaysian violinist (Music, 1999)

Theatre and Film
Shona Auerbach, award-winning director/cinematographer of Dear Frankie
Leslie Cheung, Hong Kong actor and singer (Textile Management, did not graduate due to family reason)
Emma Mackey, French-British actress
Alistair McGowan, actor, comedian and impressionist (English, 1986)
Kay Mellor, television actress and scriptwriter (attended Bretton Hall, 1983)
Hannah New, English model and actress
Kate Phillips, English actress
Ronald Pickup, English actor (English 1962)
Chris Pine, American Hollywood actor, studied as a year abroad student during his junior year (English)
Laura Rollins, English actress, studied English and Theatre
Siddhanth, Indian Kannada actor, (studied M.H.A.)

Literary
Patrick Allen, award-winning author and teacher (English and French, 1979)
Nick Brownlee, crime thriller writer
Jonathan Clements, writer (Japanese, 1994)
Tony Harrison, poet (Classics with Linguistics, 1958)
Storm Jameson, writer (English, 1912; MA 1914)
Pamela Kola, Kenyan children's author
Lucy Diamond, pen name of Sue Mongredien, children's author (English 1993)
Arthur Ransome, writer, studied science for two terms in 1901 
Herbert Read, poet and literary critic (English)
Wole Soyinka, Nigerian writer and first African winner of the Nobel Prize in Literature in 1986 (English, 1957)
Greg Stekelman, writer and illustrator, author of A Year in the Life of TheManWhoFellAsleep (English and Spanish, 1998)
Ngũgĩ wa Thiong'o, Kenyan author (English student, 1960s)

Other
Paul Crowther, philosopher, university lecturer and author
Jeremy Dyson, screenwriter and member of The League of Gentlemen (Philosophy, 1989)
Jacky Fleming, award-winning cartoonist
Barry John, theatre director and teacher
Malcolm Neesam, historian of Harrogate, North Yorkshire
Esther Simpson, organiser of academic equivalent of the kindertransport, saving refugee scholars from Nazis, campus building named after her in 2022.

Science and technology

Niaz Ahmad Akhtar, Vice Chancellor of the University of the Punjab
Lilias Armstrong, phonetician (B.A., 1906)
Sir David Baulcombe, plant scientist (Botany, 1973)
Robert Blackburn, aviation pioneer and founder of Blackburn Aircraft (Engineering, 1906)
Dave Cliff, Professor of Computer Science, University of Bristol (Computational Science, 1987)
Emily Cummins, Technology Woman of the Future 2006, British Female Innovator Of the Year 2007
Val Curtis, professor in public health, London School of Hygiene and Tropical Medicine
Rubina Gillani, Pakistani medical doctor and public health specialist 
Edmund Happold, founder of Buro Happold and the Construction Industry Council (Civil Engineering, 1957)
Sir Percival Hartley (1905) Director of Biological Standards, National Institute for Medical Research
D. G. Hessayon, gardening author (Botany, 1950)
V. Craig Jordan, responsible for pioneering research into breast cancer and the development of the cancer drug tamoxifen (BSc and Ph.D. in pharmacology, 1969 and 1972)
Esther Killick, physiologist (MB ChB 1929, MSc 1937, DSc 1952)
Michael Lawrie, computer security and social networking expert (Computational Science, 1989)
Michael Martin, bridge engineer (Civil Engineering, 1975)
Sir Timothy O'Shea, computer scientist and Vice-Chancellor and Principal of the University of Edinburgh
George Porter, chemist, Nobel Prize winner and President of the Royal Society (Chemistry, 1941)
Dan Quine, computer scientist
Anya Reading, geophysics lecturer at the University of Tasmania (PhD Geophysics 1997)
Malcolm Richardson, mycologist
Piers Sellers, NASA astronaut (Biometeorology, 1981)
Margot Shiner, gastroenterologist (Medicine, 1947)
Karen Steel, geneticist, Principal Investigator at the Wellcome Trust Sanger Institute
James Francis Tait, Endocrinologist and  discoverer of aldosterone. (Physics 1945)
Hassan Ugail, Professor of Visual Computing at the University of Bradford
Jennifer Wilby, Director of the Centre for Systems Studies, University of Hull
Guy Alfred Wyon, pathologist, researcher, lecturer
Anne Young (nurse), founder of the first Irish school of general nursing
Robert Zachary, paediatric surgeon

Other
Abdullah Yusuf Ali, translator of the Quran
Michael Asher, desert explorer and author (English 1977)
Alistair Brownlee, Olympian and ITU Triathlon World Champion (Physiology and Sport 2009)
Daniel Byles, Guinness World Record-holding ocean rower and polar explorer (Economics and Management Studies 1996)
Nancy Cruickshank, British entrepreneur in beauty, fashion, and technology
 Abdul Haque Faridi, Bangladeshi academic
Kat Fletcher, president of the National Union of Students of the United Kingdom, 2004-2006 (Sociology)
Bagrat Galstanyan, Armenian theologian and cleric, primate of the Diocese of Tavush
Andrew Harrison (born 1970), CEO of Carphone Warehouse
Peter Hendy, Baron Hendy of Richmond Hill, Chairman, Network Rail (Economics & Geography, 1975)
Richard Hoggart, sociologist and author of The Uses of Literacy (English, 1939)
Euphemia Steele Innes, RRC, DN (1874–1955), Scottish nurse, matron of Leeds General Infirmary for 21 years, principal matron of 2nd Northern General Hospital, founder of Leeds Nurses' League
Lauren Jeska, transgender fell runner convicted of the attempted murder of Ralph Knibbs (Gender Studies)
Simon Lee, businessman, Chief Executive of RSA Insurance Group (English and French)
Nicola Mendelsohn, British advertising executive (English and Theatre Studies, 1992)
Abdullah O. Nasseef, Saudi geologist, chemist and politician
W. H. New, Professor of English Literature at The University of British Columbia, Officer of the Order of Canada
Tom Palmer, Rugby Union player
David Parry, dialectologist who founded the Survey of Anglo-Welsh Dialects
Ivor Porter, ambassador and author of Operation Autonomous and King Michael (English, 1936)
Richard Profit, polar explorer (Biology and Management Studies 1996)
Subir Raha, Indian business leader (MBA 1985)
Ken Robinson, educationalist (English and drama, 1972)
Sir Christopher Rose, former head of the Court of Appeal Criminal Division (LL.B., 1957)
Jacob Rowan, former captain for the England U20 Rugby Union Team and current player for Gloucester Rugby
Harold Shipman, general practitioner and convicted serial killer (Medicine, 1970)
Reynhard Sinaga, Indonesian serial rapist and most prolific rapist in British legal history (Human geography)
George Martin Stephen, high master of St Paul's School, London (English and History)
Brigadier Mike Stone, Chief Information Officer of the Ministry of Defence
Marilyn Stowe, divorce lawyer and the first Chief Assessor and Chief Examiner of the Law Society's Family Law Panel (Law, 1970s)
Cec Thompson, rugby league player and co-founder of Student Rugby League
Paul Watson, Pohnpei State football team coach (Italian, 2005)

Staff

The following people have been members of staff at the university:
Lascelles Abercrombie, poet and literary critic (Professor of English literature, 1923-1929)
William Astbury, physicist and molecular biologist who made pioneering X-ray diffraction studies of biological molecules (Lecturer/Reader in Textile Physics, 1928-1946, Professor of Biomolecular Physics, 1946–61)
Zygmunt Bauman, sociologist
Maurice Beresford, economic historian, Medieval archaeologist (Economics, 1948-1985)
Regina Lee Blaszczyk, professor of business history and leadership chair in the history of business and society
Sir William Henry Bragg, Nobel Prize-winning physicist, chemist (Cavendish Professor of Physics, 1909-1915)
 Asa Briggs, historian
Dame Lynne Brindley, Chief Executive of British Library (University Librarian, 1997-2000)
Selig Brodetsky (1888–1954), mathematician, President of the Hebrew University of Jerusalem
Anthony Carrigan (lecturer in postcolonial literature and cultures, 2013–16)
Anastasios Christodoulou, Deputy Secretary of Leeds University and Foundation Secretary of the Open University
Pit Corder, professor and applied linguist (1961-1964)
David Crighton, mathematician (Mathematics, 1974-1985)
Norman Greenwood, Australian chemist, and Emeritus Professor
Geoffrey Hill, poet (English, 1954-1980)
Geoff Hoon, politician (Law, 1976-1981)
Jane Ingham, botanist (Research assistant to Joseph Hubert Priestley, 1920-1930)
Sir Christopher Ingold, chemist
Benedikt Isserlin, semitist and ancient historian
Catherine Karkov, art historian
Susanne Karstedt, criminologist
Percy Fry Kendall, award-winning geologist (Geology 1904-22)
Ursula King, scholar of religion and gender 
G. Wilson Knight, literary critic (English)
Owen Lattimore, pioneer in Chinese studies (Professor of Chinese studies, 1963-1970)
Irene Manton, botanist and cell biologist (Professor of Biology, 1946-1969)
David I. Masson, British science-fiction writer (assistant librarian 1938-1939; curator of the Brotherton Collection 1956-1979)
Duncan McCargo, Professor of Political Science (twice Head of School of Politics and International Studies), 1993-2020
John Anthony McGuckin, former Reader in Patristic and Byzantine Theology
Sir Roy Meadow, paediatrician
Ralph Miliband, political theorist (Professor and Head of Politics department, 1972-1978)
David Macey, Intellectual historian 
Fred Orton, art historian
Joseph Hubert Priestley, botanist (Professor of Botany, 1911-1944)
Sheena Radford, Astbury Professor of Biophysics
Leonard James Rogers, mathematician (Mathematics 1889-1919)
James Scott, chair of obstetrics and gynaecology 1961–89
Wole Soyinka, Nigerian Nobel Prize winner
J. I. M. Stewart, writer, often under the pen name Michael Innes (English, 1930-1935)
Philip Thody, writer, editor, translator and Professor of French Literature from 1965 to 1993
E. P. Thompson, historian (Extramural, 1948-1965)
J. R. R. Tolkien, writer (English, 1920-1925)
Stephen Turnbull, military historian
 Philip Wilby, composer, School of Music until 2006
 Fiona Williams, Professor of Social Policy from 1996 to 2012
Ian N. Wood, historian of the Middle Ages
Verna Wright, Professor of Rheumatology

References

External links
 University of Leeds homepage

 
Leeds, University of
University people